Ryan John Currier (born November 26, 1972), better known as Ryan Robbins, is a Canadian actor.

Early life
Robbins was born in Victoria, British Columbia.

Career
Robbins is known for his roles as Ladon Radim in Stargate Atlantis, Henry Foss on Sanctuary and is the only actor to have played two different characters (not counting different incarnations of Cylon models as different characters) in the re-imagined Battlestar Galactica, having originally starred in the 2003 Battlestar Galactica miniseries, with heavy makeup and prosthetics to age him, as the Colonial officer assigned to Armistice Station, followed by a recurring role as Charlie Connor in the third and fourth seasons of the Battlestar Galactica 2004–2009 TV series. Robbins later played Diego in the 2010 Battlestar Galactica prequel series Caprica.

Robbins has also guest starred in the TV series jPod as Alistair Parish and as Wendell on the Canadian series The Guard. In 2011 he played the role of John Grey in the film Apollo 18. He starred as Rand in Riese, Brad Tonkin in seasons 3 and 4 of Continuum and Tector in Falling Skies.  In 2015 he had a recurring role on Arrow. He has a lead role in the Canadian series Pure.

In 2019, Robbins was cast as Frank Andrews in the television series Riverdale.

Filmography

Film

Television

Web

Music videos

References

External links

 

Canadian male television actors
Male actors from Victoria, British Columbia
Living people
1972 births
Canadian male film actors
Canadian male voice actors